New York City's Bitter Grace performed for ten years and went through continuous rounds of line-up changes during the making of this album.  Similar in vein to the sound of Joy Division, Bauhaus and other post-punk goth rockers, God and the Abyss was a long journey that lasted from the first recording in 1985 to the final release in 1997.  A very dark CD as a whole, sole founder Gustavo Lapis Ahumad went through three keyboardists, two guitarists and three drummers in order to complete the album.

Track listing
All songs by Gustavo Lapis Ahumad except "The Very Last Goodbye" by David Ordenana & Bitter Grace.
 "Beneath the Ocean Black" – 2:29
 "Special One" – 4:37
 "Sane" – 6:00
 "Nothing Here" – 6:11
 "Ashes in the Rain" – 4:49
 "Precious" – 5:45
 "The Very Last Goodbye" – 5:22
 "God and the Abyss" – 1:56
 "Fever" – 2:55
 "Burning Kisses" – 6:16
 "Requiem" – 5:53

Personnel
 Gustavo Lapis Ahumad - Writer / Producer / Vocals / Art
 Peter Cortinas - Guitars
 Jason Mathew James - Guitars
 David Ordenana - Bass
 Alex Smith - Keyboards
 Thierry Casias - Keyboards
 Alex Orlov - Keyboards
 Adrian Q - Drums
 Jerry Kong - Drums
 Kevin X - Drums
 Michael Barile - Engineer
 Thomas Duncan - Engineer
 Giovanni Fusco - Engineer
 Francine Barile - Production Assistant
 Saul Zonana - Mastering
 Dina of Red Evil Photography - Photos
 Vicky Novak - Post Production Assistant
 Joy Victims - Management

1997 albums
Bitter Grace albums